The 2020–21 Armenian First League season is the 29th since its establishment. The season was launched on 14 August 2020 and will conclude on 29 May 2021.

Stadiums and locations

League table

Statistics

Top scorers
.

References

External links

Armenian First League seasons
Armenia
1